Hernando Delfin Carmelo Arreza Iriberri (born April 22, 1960) is a retired Filipino soldier, and was Chief of Staff of the Armed Forces of the Philippines from July 2015 to April 2016. He had previously been the 56th Commanding General of the Philippine Army since February 7, 2014.

Biography 

Iriberri was commissioned in the AFP Regular Force in March 1983 after his graduation from the Philippine Military Academy. Aside from mainly serving as an infantryman, he was also involved in other fields of the Army such as intelligence, public relations and staff functions. Iriberri was involved in international peace support operations.

He had served as spokesman under the term of Voltaire Gazmin (the incumbent Secretary of National Defense) as Commanding General, and Senior Military Assistant at the same department before becoming Commander of the Army's 503rd Brigade in Abra and later Chief of the 7th Infantry Division.

Philippine Army
Iriberri, who was a Major General at that time, was named Commanding General of the Philippine Army, replacing Lt. Gen. Noel A. Coballes on February 7, 2014 when the latter had reached the mandatory retirement age of 56.  Iriberri was promoted to the rank of Lieutenant General on March 31, 2014.

Chief of Staff
On July 10, 2015, Iriberri was appointed as the 46th Chief of Staff of the Armed Forces of the Philippines at a ceremony in Camp Aguinaldo in Quezon City.

Iriberri's retirement officially took effect on April 22, 2016.

Awards
  Philippine Republic Presidential Unit Citation
  Philippine Legion of Honor -Officer
  Anti-Dissidence Campaign Medal
  Luzon Anti Dissidence Campaign Medal
  Gold Cross (Philippines)
  Parangal sa Kapanalig ng Sandatahang Lakas ng Pilipinas
  United Nations Service Medal 
  Military Civic Action Medal 
  Military Commendation Medal
  Military Merit Medal (Philippines)
  Mindanao Anti-dissidence Campaign Medal
  Disaster Relief and Rehabilitation Operations Ribbon
  Combat Commander's Badge (Philippines)
   Distinguished Service Star
  Outstanding Achievement Medal
   Silver Wing Medal
  Bronze Cross Medals
   Gawad sa Kaunlaran
  Malaysian Armed Forces Order of Valor, First Commander
  Scout Ranger Badge
  Combat Commander's Badge (Philippines)

References 

1960 births
Living people
Chairmen of the Joint Chiefs (Philippines)
Filipino generals
Philippine Army generals
People from Surigao del Sur
Benigno Aquino III administration personnel
Philippine Military Academy alumni
Recipients of the Philippine Republic Presidential Unit Citation
Recipients of the Philippine Legion of Honor
Recipients of the Gold Cross (Philippines)
Recipients of the Military Civic Action Medal
Recipients of the Military Merit Medal (Philippines)
Recipients of the Military Commendation Medal
Recipients of the Distinguished Service Star
Recipients of the Outstanding Achievement Medal
Recipients of the Silver Wing Medal
Recipients of the Bronze Cross Medal